Kevin Shem (born 5 December 1993) is a Vanuatuan footballer who plays as a defender for Tafea in the Port Vila Football League. He made his debut for the national team on June 3, 2012 in their 5–0 victory against Samoa.

References

External links
 Kevin Shem at Oceania Football Center

Living people
1993 births
Vanuatuan footballers
Vanuatu international footballers
Association football defenders
Tafea F.C. players
Nalkutan F.C. players
2012 OFC Nations Cup players
2016 OFC Nations Cup players
Vanuatu under-20 international footballers